The Dakotas is an ABC/Warner Bros. western television series starring Larry Ward and featuring Jack Elam, Chad Everett, and Michael Greene,  broadcast during 1963.  The short-lived program is considered a spin-off of Clint Walker's Cheyenne.

The Dakotas was cancelled one week after heavy viewer protest over an objectionable scene.

Synopsis
The series follows the efforts of U.S. Marshal Frank Ragan (Larry Ward) and his three deputies, J. D.Smith (Jack Elam), Vance Porter (Mike Greene), and Del Stark (Chad Everett) as they try to keep order in the Dakota Territory during the Gilded Age prior to statehood in 1889.

Series history
All four characters initially appeared in an April 23, 1962 episode of Cheyenne entitled "A Man Called Ragan", directors Richard C. Sarafian and Robert Sparr (uncredited), and writers Anthony Spinner (teleplay) and Harry Whittington (story).

However, the degree to which this episode makes The Dakotas a spin-off of Cheyenne is debatable.  In the pilot on Cheyenne, the titular character of Cheyenne Bodie never appears.  Also, the episode had followed five consecutive weeks of Bronco episodes, broadcast as a part of the wheel series that Cheyenne had effectively become.  Moreover, the length of time between pilot and series—almost eight months—further weakened the link between Cheyenne and The Dakotas.  The biggest tip-off to viewers as to the parentage of the series was that it had assumed the Monday 7:30 p.m. ET time slot previously occupied since 1959 by Cheyenne.

Guest stars

Among the many guest stars, George Macready appeared as Captain Ridgeway, with Jeanne Cooper as Rebecca Ridgeway, in the third episode, "Mutiny at Fort Mercy". Chris Robinson was cast as Chino in "Red Sky over Bismarck", with Andrew Duggan as Colonel Winters and Kevin Hagen as a preacher. Warren Stevens and Karen Sharpe played Cain and Angela Manning in the episode, "Crisis at High Banjo"; Robert J. Wilke was cast in the same episode as Judge Markham.

Other guest stars included:

Claude Akins
Chris Alcaide
Fred Aldrich
Edward Binns
Whit Bissell
Willis Bouchey
Lane Bradford
Stewart Bradley
John Brandon
Diane Brewster
Steve Brodie
Joe Brooks
Spencer Chan
Michael Constantine
Russ Conway
Elisha Cook, Jr.
Ted de Corsia
Susanne Cramer
Audrey Dalton
Royal Dano
Frank DeKova
Bill Erwin
William Fawcett
Med Flory
Joan Freeman
Victor French
Beverly Garland

Coleen Gray
Herman Hack
Carl Held
Rex Holman
Richard Jaeckel
Russell Johnson
I. Stanford Jolley
Don Keefer
DeForest Kelley
Don Kennedy
Werner Klemperer
Nolan Leary
Norman Leavitt
Dayton Lummis
Strother Martin
Ken Mayer
Mercedes McCambridge
Roger Mobley
Joanna Moore
Ed Nelson
Dennis Patrick
Sue Randall
Joseph Ruskin
Telly Savalas
Alex Sharp
Robert F. Simon
Everett Sloane
Karl Swenson
Harry Townes
Lee Van Cleef
James Westerfield
Gregory Walcott

Cancellation
When viewers saw the program's eighteenth episode, "Sanctuary at Crystal Springs", they were shocked by a scene that depicted the lawmen killing two outlaws in a church, one of whom had caused injury to a pastor, played by Charles Irving, before dying. Calls for The Dakotas to end its run were answered virtually overnight.  After just one more episode, the show was pulled.  A twentieth episode, entitled "Black Gold", was completed, but was never shown.

Episodes
Several episode titles refer to geographic place names in the Dakotas.

Home media
On March 24, 2015, Warner Bros. released The Dakotas- The Complete Series on DVD via their Warner Archive Collection.  This is a manufacture-on-demand (MOD) release, available through Warner's online store and Amazon.com.

References
 The Boys Western Television and Film Annual (Purnell & Sons Ltd 1963)

Footnotes

External links
 
 Show information at Women Writers Block
 The Dakotas show intro: YouTube video
 Cast photo of The Dakotas series stars Michael Greene,Jack Elam,Larry Ward, and Chad Everett

1963 American television series debuts
1963 American television series endings
Black-and-white American television shows
English-language television shows
Television series by Warner Bros. Television Studios
American television spin-offs
1960s Western (genre) television series
United States Marshals Service in fiction
Dakota Territory